The United States Army Training and Doctrine Command (TRADOC) is a major command of the United States Army headquartered at Fort Eustis, Virginia. It is charged with overseeing training of Army forces and the development of operational doctrine. TRADOC operates 37 schools and centers at 27 different locations. TRADOC schools conduct 1,304 courses and 108 language courses. The 1,304 courses include 516,000 seats (resident, on-site and distributed learning) for 443,231 soldiers; 36,145 other-service personnel; 8,314 international soldiers; and 28,310 civilians.

The current commanding general of TRADOC summarizes its function as an organization to design, develop, and build the Army. Thus, three major commands of the Army (TRADOC, FORSCOM, and AMC) shape its present "men and materiel".

Mission
The official mission statement for TRADOC states:
Training and Doctrine Command develops, educates and trains Soldiers, civilians, and leaders; supports unit training; and designs, builds and integrates a versatile mix of capabilities, formations, and equipment to strengthen the U.S. Army as America's Force of Decisive Action.

History
General Creighton Abrams, Chief of Staff of the US Army, identified that the Army needed to be reoriented and retrained to counter the conventional threat of the Soviets and ordered the establishment of Training and Doctrine Command. TRADOC was established as a major U.S. Army command on 1 July 1973; it first chief was William Depuy. 

The new command, along with the U.S. Army Forces Command (FORSCOM), was created from the Continental Army Command (CONARC) located at Fort Monroe, Virginia. That action was the major innovation in the Army's post-Vietnam reorganization, in the face of realization that CONARC's obligations and span of control were too broad for efficient focus. The new organization functionally realigned the major Army commands in the continental United States. CONARC, and Headquarters, U.S. Army Combat Developments Command (CDC), situated at Fort Belvoir, Virginia, were discontinued, with TRADOC and FORSCOM at Fort Belvoir assuming the realigned missions. TRADOC assumed the combat developments mission from CDC, took over the individual training mission formerly the responsibility of CONARC, and assumed command from CONARC of the major Army installations in the United States housing Army training center and Army branch schools. FORSCOM assumed CONARC's operational responsibility for the command and readiness of all divisions and corps in the continental U.S. and for the installations where they were based.

Joined under TRADOC, the major Army missions of individual training and combat developments each had its own lineage. The individual training responsibility had belonged, during World War II, to Headquarters Army Ground Forces (AGF). In 1946 numbered army areas were established in the U.S. under AGF command. At that time, the AGF moved from Washington, D.C. to Fort Monroe. In March 1948, the AGF was replaced at Fort Monroe with the new Office, Chief of Army Field Forces (OCAFF). OCAFF, however, did not command the training establishment. That function was exercised by Headquarters, Department of the Army through the numbered armies to the corps, division, and Army Training Centers. In February 1955, HQ Continental Army Command (CONARC) replaced OCAFF, assuming its missions as well as the training missions from DA. In January, HQ CONARC was redesignated U.S. Continental Army Command. Combat developments emerged as a formal Army mission in the early 1950s, and OCAFF assumed that role in 1952. In 1955, CONARC assumed the mission. In 1962, HQ U.S. Army Combat Development Command (CDC) was established to bring the combat developments function under one major Army command.

Sub-organizations

Core function leads
Combined Arms Center (USACAC)
Army University
U.S. Army Cadet Command
Reserve Officers' Training Corps
United States Army Recruiting Command
Recruiting and Retention College
Center for Initial Military Training
Basic Combat Training
Fort Benning
Fort Jackson
Fort Leonard Wood
Fort Sill
Officer Candidate School
United States Army Center of Military History, excepting the Institute of Heraldry, which remains within the Office of the Administrative Assistant to the Secretary of the Army

Centers of excellence
Aviation Center of Excellence (USAACE)
Cyber Center of Excellence (CyberCoE)
Cyber School
Signal School
Fires Center of Excellence (FCoE)
Field Artillery School
Air Defense Artillery School
Intelligence Center of Excellence (USAICoE)
Maneuver Center of Excellence (MCoE)
Armor School
Infantry School
Maneuver Support Center of Excellence (MSCoE)
Engineer School
Chemical, Biological, Radiological, Nuclear (CBRN) School
Military Police School
Medical Department Center and School (MEDCoE)
Mission Command Center of Excellence (MCCoE)
NCO Leadership Center of Excellence (NCOLCoE)
Sergeants Major Academy
Fort Bliss NCO Academy
 Sustainment Center of Excellence (SCoE) (Combined Arms Support Command (CASCOM))
Adjutant General School
Army Logistics University
Logistics Leader College
College of Professional and Continuing Education
Army Sustainment (professional publication)
NCO Academy
Transportation
Ordnance
Quartermaster
Financial Management School
Ordnance School
Quartermaster School
Joint Culinary Center of Excellence
Soldier Support Institute
Transportation School

Former
 United States Army Capabilities Integration Center
 Brigade Modernization Command

Commanders

The current Commanding General is GEN Gary Brito. The Command Sergeant Major is currently CSM Daniel T. Hendrex.

See also
 John F. Kennedy Special Warfare Center and School
 Human dimension
U.S. Armed Forces training and education commands
 Marine Corps Training and Education Command
 Naval Education and Training Command
 Air Education and Training Command
 Space Training and Readiness Command

References

 Fact Sheet
 Organization Chart
 TRADOC Website 
 Joint Base Langley - Eustis

External links 
 
 

 
1973 establishments in Virginia
Military units and formations established in 1973